Rudrankksh Patil is an Indian sport shooter. He has won medals at Shooting World Cup. In December 2022 he ranked first in 10m air rifle. He has secured Olympic quota after winning gold at 2022 ISSF World Shooting Championships.

References

External links 
  at the International Sports Shooting Federation

Indian sport shooters
2003 births
Living people